La Fava is a mountain in the Bernese Alps in Valais, between the Diablerets and the Rhone valley.

References

Mountains of the Alps
Mountains of Switzerland
Mountains of Valais
Two-thousanders of Switzerland